Aashish Singh (born in Mumbai) is an Indian film producer. He was previously the heads of production at Yash Raj Films, a film studio in India.

Career 
He is the CEO at Lyca Productions a leading production house producing films in Tamil and Hindi. He was earlier Director, Original Film at Netflix and briefly was the CEO of Motion Pictures at Balaji Telefilms. He was previously the Vice President at Yash Raj Films, where he was also an executive producer for all films produced there. Films he produced include Chak De India, Tiger Zinda Hai, Sultan, Hichki, Dhoom 3', Dhoom 2, Ek Tha Tiger, Jab Tak Hai Jaan, Band Bajaa Baaraat. 

Singh has also produced Ek Tha Tiger, Dhoom 2, Jab Tak Hai Jaan, Rab Ne Bana Di Jodi, New York and Band Baaja''. He has executive produced the most films in the Hindi language and shot films in more than thirty-five countries.

Filmography 
https://www.imdb.com/name/nm0802088/?ref_=fn_al_nm_1

References 

Film producers from Mumbai
Living people
Year of birth missing (living people)